The  or  is an Anti-tank/Landing craft missile used by the Japanese army as JGSDF.

Description
Chū-MPM is smaller scale and much less expensive than the Type 96 MPMS.  As such, it is deployed in greater numbers. The system controls are contained entirely within each vehicle for taking independent action.

The missiles are guided by Semi-Active Laser Homing or Infrared Imaging.

Operators
: 104 Sets (2017)

Gallery

See also
 Type 96 MPMS
 Type 64 MAT
 Type 79 Jyu-MAT
 Type 01 LMAT

External links

 防衛省 平成20年度 事前の政策評価（調達） -  要旨 本文 参考
 防衛省 平成21年度 事後の政策評価（開発） -  要旨 本文 参考

Post–Cold War anti-tank missiles of Japan
Anti-tank guided missiles of Japan
Japan Ground Self-Defense Force
Military equipment introduced in the 2000s